Ravinia Festival is an outdoor music venue in Highland Park, Illinois. It hosts a series of outdoor concerts and performances every summer from June to September. The first orchestra to perform at Ravinia Festival was the New York Philharmonic under Walter Damrosch on June 17, 1905, with the Chicago Tribune praising its "musical entertainment so satisfying in quality and so delightful in environment." It has been the summer home of the Chicago Symphony Orchestra (CSO) since 1936. Located in the Ravinia neighborhood, the venue operates on the grounds of the  Ravinia Park, with a variety of outdoor and indoor performing arts facilities, including the architectural prairie style Martin Theater. The Ravinia Festival attracts about 600,000 listeners to some 120 to 150 events that span all genres from classical music to jazz to music theater over each three-month summer season. 

The Ravinia neighborhood, once an incorporated village before annexation in 1899, is actively maintained by the Ravinia Neighbors Association, who work to enhance and preserve Ravinia's architecture, history, and environment. The business district on Roger Williams Ave., within walking distance from the Ravinia Festival grounds, includes neighborhood service businesses and restaurants. Ravinia takes its name from the numerous steep-sided ravines that slice the land.

Overview 
In 1904, the A.C. Frost Company created Ravinia as an amusement park intended to lure riders to the fledgling Chicago and Milwaukee Electric Railroad. The amusement park had a baseball diamond, electric fountain and refectory or casino building with dining rooms and a dance floor. The prairie-style Martin Theatre (then called Ravinia Theatre) is the only building on the grounds that dates back to that original construction. When the park's existence became jeopardized following the railroad's bankruptcy, local residents (for the most part Chicago businessmen) formed a corporation in 1911 to purchase and operate the park. Music was a confirmed summer activity from then on, except for a brief hiatus during the Great Depression and the COVID-19 pandemic.

The Ravinia Festival has been widely acclaimed throughout its history. In the 1920s, it was known as the summer opera capital of the world due to businessman Louis Eckstein, who booked all-opera seasons and artists from the Chicago Opera and New York Metropolitan Opera Companies. By 1930, Ravinia had featured performers including Yvonne Gall, Edward Johnson, and Giovanni Martinelli. However, the high costs of opera performances ultimately led to financial ruin for Ravinia, and it closed for four years. In 1936, North Shore residents raised enough funds to attract the Chicago Symphony Orchestra who then made Ravinia its permanent summer residence.

In addition to symphony concerts, often with guest soloists, the venue hosts opera, jazz, blues, folk, rock, and popular music performances, plus ballet, drama, and educational programs which take place year-round. These educational programs serve around 75,000 people each year in Chicago area schools without a music program. The longest running program—Jazz Mentors and Scholars—assembles the best Chicago Public School musicians with city musicians to create a larger ensemble. 

Over the years, Ravinia Festival has hosted many famous artists. Recent artists who have performed at Ravinia include John Legend, Aretha Franklin, Bryan Ferry, Diana Ross, Maroon 5, Common, Carrie Underwood, Tony Bennett, Lady Gaga, Josh Groban, Dolly Parton, Sheryl Crow, Patti LaBelle, Andrew Bird, Darius Rucker, Mary J. Blige, Gladys Knight, James Taylor, Santana, Stevie Nicks, Patti LuPone, Smokey Robinson, Sting and John Mellencamp among others.

Performance venues

The Pavilion is a 3,350-seat venue where the park's major music events and concerts—including Chicago Symphony Orchestra performances—are held.
 The Martin Theatre is an 850-seat indoor hall often used for chamber music, semi-staged opera performances, Martinis at the Martin cabaret series, and other shows.
 Bennett Gordon Hall is the 450-seat home of Ravinia's Steans Music Institute, the $10 BGH Classics Series, and also used for pre-concert discussions and preview concerts. Ravinia's Steans Music Institute is the Ravinia Festival's pre-professional summer conservatory program. Three programs comprise the Institute's summer season: the program for jazz; the program for piano and strings, and the program for singers.
 The Lawn is an expansive area for picnics during performances. Music is broadcast via a sound system and a large video screen is sometimes displayed.

Grounds

For most attendees, Ravinia is experienced on the 36 acre (150,000 m²) parkland and lawn. Ravinia is one of the few concert venues in the country to allow full meals to be brought in and consumed at concerts, even allowing alcoholic beverages. Accordingly, most grocery stores and specialty restaurants in and around the Highland Park area offer ready-to-eat Ravinia picnics for purchase.

The park is served by the Metra commuter railroad station Ravinia Park outside the front gate with special stops before and after concerts. It is the last private train stop in Illinois. The noted British conductor Sir Thomas Beecham, who guest-conducted the CSO there in 1940, referred to Ravinia as "the only railway station with a resident orchestra." Visitors get dropped off and picked up right at the front gate.

Artistic directors

 Walter Hendl, Artistic Director (1959–1963)
 Seiji Ozawa, Music Director (1964–1968)and principal conductor (1969)
 Edward Gordon, Executive Director (1968–1989)
 István Kertész, Principal Conductor (1970–1972)
 James Levine, Music Director (1973–1993)

 Zarin Mehta, Executive Director, President & CEO (1990–2000)
 Christoph Eschenbach, Music Director (1995–2003)
 James Conlon, Music Director (2005–2015)
 Ramsey Lewis, Artistic Director, Jazz at Ravinia (1992–2022)
 Welz Kauffman, President & CEO (2000–2020)
 Marin Alsop, Artistic Curator (2018–2019) and Chief Conductor and Curator (2020–present)
 Jeffrey P. Haydon, President & CEO (2020–present)

James Levine was named "Conductor Laureate" in April 2017, to begin performances in summer 2018. On December 4, 2017, the Ravinia Festival severed all ties with Levine, in the wake of sexual abuse allegations against him, dating back to decades earlier at the Ravinia Festival.

See also
 List of contemporary amphitheatres
 List of opera festivals

References

Amphitheaters in the United States
Amusement parks in Illinois
Music venues in Illinois
Music festivals in Illinois
Opera festivals
Highland Park, Illinois
Tourist attractions in Lake County, Illinois
Buildings and structures in Lake County, Illinois
Music festivals established in 1904
1904 establishments in Illinois